Oswald Duda (11 April 1869 – 21 November 1941), full name Pavel Theodor Friedrich Oswald Duda was a German entomologist mainly interested in Diptera.

Duda was born in Silesia 11 April 1869. He died in  Habelschwerdt  now Bystrzyca Kłodzka  21 November 1941.

References

Publications 
(selected)

1918. Revision der europäischen Arten der Gattung Limosina Macquart (Dipteren).Abhandlungen der k.k. zoologisch-botanischen Gesellschaft in Wien 10(1): 1-240.
1920. Revision der altweltlichen Arten der Gattung Sphaerocera Latreille (Dipteren).Tijdschrift voor Entomologie 63: 1-39.
1920 Vorläufige Mitteilung zur Kenntnis der aussereuropäischen Arten der Gattungen Leptocera Olivier = Limosina Macq. und Borborus Meigen (Dipteren). Zoologische Jahrbücher. Zeitschrift für Systematik, Geographie und Biologie der Tiere, Jena 43: 433-446.
1921. Fiebrigella und Archiborborus, zwei neue südamerikanische Borboriden-Gattungen (Dipteren). Tijdschrift voor Entomologie 64: 119-146.
1922. Borborinae. In Becker, T.: Wissenschaftliche Ergebnisse der mit Unterstützung der Akademie der Wissenschaften in Wien aus der Erbschaft Treitl von F. Werner unternommenen zoologischen Expedition nach dem Anglo-Ägyptischen Sudan (Kordofan)Bibliography  341 1914. VI. Diptera. Denkschriften der (keiserlichen) Akademie der Wissenschaften, Wien,Mathematisch-Naturwissenschaftliche Klasse, 98: 75-77.
1923. Revision der altweltlichen Arten der Gattung Borborus (Cypsela) Meigen (Dipteren). Archiv für Naturgeschichte, Berlin, Abteilung A, 89 (4): 35-112.
1924. Beitrag zur Systematik der Limosinen-Untergattungen Trachyopella und Elachisoma und Beschreibung von Elachisoma pilosa, n.sp. ♀ (Dipteren). Konowia 3: 5-9.
1924. Berichtigungen zur Revision der europäischen Arten der Gattung Limosina Macq. (Dipteren), nebst Beschreibung von sechs neuen Arten. Verhandlungen der zoologisch-botanischen Gesellschaft in Wien 73(1923): 163-180.
1924. Aptilotella Borgmeieri ♂, eine neue flügellose Borboride (Dipt.) aus Brasilien. Tijdschrift voor Entomologie 64: 119-146.
1925. Die außereuropäischen Arten der Gattung Leptocera Olivier - Limosina Macquart(Dipteren) mit Berücksichtigung der europäischen Arten. Archiv für Naturgeschichte, Berlin, Abteilung A, 90(11)(1924): 5-215.
1926. Sphaerocera cornuta ♀, eine neue Borboride (Diptera) aus Centralafrika. Deutsche entomologische Zeitschrift 1925: 381-384.
1928. Bemerkungen zur Systematik und Ökologie einiger europäischer Limosinen und Beschreibung von Scotophilella splendens n.sp. (Diptera). Konowia 7: 162-174.
1929. Die Ausbeute der deutschen Chako-Expedition 1925/1926 (Diptera). VI. Sepsidae,VII. Piophilidae, VIII. Cypselidae, IX. Drosophilidae und X. Chloropidae. Konowia 8(1): 33-50.
1935. Cypselidae. In Sjöstedt Y.: Entomologische Ergebnisse der schwedischen Kamtchatka-Expedition 1920-1922. Arkiv för Zoologi, A, 28: 12-13.
1938. 57. Sphaeroceridae (Cypselidae). In Lindner, E. (ed.): Die Fliegen der Paläarktischen Region. Vol.6, 182 pp., E. Schweizerbart.sche Verlagsbuchhandlung, Stuttgart.

External links
 Entom.mon Mag. paper commenting on Duda's "cavalier approach"
Zobodat provides pdf s of some publications

1869 births
1941 deaths
German entomologists
Dipterists